Puchito Records was Cuba's second independent record label.  It was founded in 1954 during the mambo and cha-cha-chá explosion of the 1950s.  Many of its recordings, produced by its founder Jesús Gorís (1921–2006), became instant hits.  Cuban music styles represented in its discography include danzón, güajira, son cubano, son montuno, cha-cha-chá, guaracha, guaguancó, Cuban bolero, Cuban rumba, mambo, new flamenco, and Zarzuela.  Other styles include farruca, merengue (Dominican), Ranchera (Mexican), nueva canción (Mexican)  styles from Spain include cuplé, pasodoble, and flamenco. The ensembles range from studio orchestras to jazz combos to big bands to charangas.

Singles 

 Joseíto Fernández ySu ConjuntoDialogs: Luisa Mauban, Juan C. Romaro, R. Miravallas"Tu Misma Me Acostumbraste"Joseíto Fernández (w&m)8005  (78 rpm)
 Joseíto Fernández ySu ConjuntoDialogs: Martha Casanas, Juan C. Romaro, R. Miravallas"Copas y Amigos"Pedro Espinel Torres (w&m)8005  (78 rpm)(First known recording by Puchito; Puchito Catalog N° 101)
 Ñico Membiela, vocalOrquesta Chuíto Vélez"Sa Lazaro"101-A (45 rpm)
 Ñico Membiela, vocalOrquesta Chuíto Vélez"Olvido"By Miguel Matamoros101-B (45 rpm)
 Joseíto Fernández y Su Conjunto"Mi Madre y Mi Tierra" (1957)By Joseíto Fernández45-102-A (45 rpm)
 Joseíto Fernández y Su Conjunto"Tu Misma Me Acostumbraste" (1957)By Joseíto Fernández45-102-B (45 rpm)
 Olga GuillotCastro Brothers Orchestra109 (released 1956)
 Laíto Sureda y Conjunto Senén SuárezReleased in 1952"Guaguancó Callejero" ("Dichosa Habana")()112
 Laíto Sureda y Conjunto Senén SuárezReleased in 1952"Yo Te Perdono"Roberto Goyeneche (music)Enrique Cadícamo (words)112
 Conjunto Jóvenes Del CayoAlfonsín Quintana (lead vocalist)"Qué Te Pasa  Qué No Vienes"By Juan Puig115-1 (78 rpm)
 Conjunto Jóvenes Del CayoDomingo Vargas (lead vocalist)"Jorobita Joroba"Alfonso Salinas (w&m)115-2 (78 rpm)
 Senén Suárez"La Negra Margot"By Juan A. RojasA1 116-1
 Senén Suárez"Con Suavidad"By José Betancourt)B1 116-2
 Senén SuárezY Su Conjunto del Tropicana Night Club"Señora Maria" (1953)Pablo Cairo (w&m)Matrix: 120-1Matrix: 78-1201120-A (78 rpm)
 Senén SuárezY Su Conjunto del Tropicana Night Club"Yambeque" (1953)Eduardo Angulo (w&m)Matrix: 120-2Matrix: 78-1202120-B (78 rpm)
 Senén Suárez y Su Conjunto Del Tropicana Night ClubRecorded around 1952"El '23'" ("Vapor")Senén Suárez (w&m)Senén Suárez y  Raúl Fundora (vocalists)Serie Internacional 138
 Olga Guillot con Su Orquesta Hermanos CastroReleased 1954"Miénteme"Armando "Chamaco" Domínguez (w&m)161 (78 rpm)
 Olga Guillot con Su Orquesta Hermanos CastroReleased in 1954"Estamos En Paz"Antonio Pereyra (w&m)161 (78 rpm)
 Olga Guillot con Su Orquesta Hermanos Castro"Por Eso Estoy Así"Juan Bruno Tarraza (w&m)162 (78 rpm)
 Olga Guillot con Su Orquesta Hermanos Castro"Eso y Más"Juan Bruno Tarraza (w&m)162 (78 rpm)
 Olga Guillot con Su Orquesta Hermanos CastroReleased in 1954"Sola"Pablo De Los Andes (w&m)163?? (78 rpm)162
 Olga Guillot con Su Orquesta Hermanos CastroReleased in 1954"No Me Quieras Así"Facundo Rivero(Facundo Rivéro Montalvo) (words)Anonymous (music)163?? (78 rpm)162
 Olga Guillot con Su Orquesta Hermanos CastroReleased 1954"Palabras Calladas"(theme from the 1951 Mexican comedy film, Snow White)Juan Bruno Tarraza (w&m)165 (78 rpm)Matrix: G8-OB-3328
 Olga Guillot con Su Orquesta Hermanos CastroReleased 1954"Vivir de los Recuerdos"Bobby Collazo(Roberto Cecilio Collazo Peña)165 (78 rpm)
 Olga Guillot con Su Orquesta Hermanos CastroReleased 1954"En Nosotros"Tania Castellanos (w&m)171Matrix: G8-OB-8478
 Olga Guillot con Su Orquesta Hermanos CastroReleased 1954"Soy Tuya"Juan Bruno Tarraza (w&m)171Matrix: G8-OB-8479
 Cheo Marquetti, vocalOrquesta Sensación"Guajiras de Hoy"176 (45 rpm)
 Cheo Marquetti, vocalOrquesta Sensación"Seven Boy"176 (45 rpm)
 Olga Guillot con Su Orquesta Hermanos CastroReleased 1954"La Gloria Eres Tú"José Antonio Méndez (w&m)180-A (78 rpm)
 Olga Guillot con Su Orquesta Hermanos CastroReleased 1954"Al Fin Estoy Enamorada"Luis Yáñez (w&m)180-B (78 rpm)
 Miguelito Valdés, vocalCastro Brothers Orchestra"Mamita Cambia"By José Slater Badán181(45 rpm) E4-KW-184
 Miguelito Valdés, vocalCastro Brothers Orchestra"Mis Cinco Hijos"181(45 rpm) E4-KW-18?
 Gina Martín, vocalCastro Brother Orchestra"A Santa Bárbara"By Celina & Reutilio(Reutilio Domínguez)187 (45 rpm)
 Gina Martín, vocalCastro Brother Orchestra"El 17"By Celina &  Reutilio(Reutilio Domínguez)187 (45 rpm)
 Chappottín y sus EstrellasVocalists:Rene AlvarezWichiFiliberto Hernández Fuentes"Yo Soy Tiburón"Jesús Guerra (w&m)()199-A
 Chappottín y sus EstrellasVocalists:Rene AlvarezWichiFiliberto Hernández Fuentes"Blanca Luna"Virgilio González Solar199-B
 Orquesta SensaciónRolando Valdés, director"Aprendiendo el Chachacha" (1958)By Rolando Valdés206-A(45 rpm) F8-OW-0884
 Orquesta SensaciónRolando Valdés, director"Caumbia" (1958)By Pedro Ramos206-B(45 rpm) F8-OW-0885
 René del Mar and His Cunjunto"Como Te Gusta A Ti"Enrique Bonne209(45 rpm) F8-OW-6793
 René del Mar and His Cunjunto"Quedate Con Todo"209(45 rpm) F8-OW-6792
 Chappottín y sus Estrellas Miguelito Cuní, vocalist"Que Se Fuñan" (1958)By Luis Martínez Griñán220(45 rpm) F8-OW-8474
 Chappottín y sus Estrellas "No Vengas Por Mi" (1958)By Félix Chappottín220 (45 rpm)
 Orquesta Hermanos CastroWith Carlos Díaz"Amanecer Cubano"Julio Blanco Léonard (w&m)222-A (45 rpm)
 Orquesta Hermanos CastroWith Carlos Díaz"Cayetano Baila"Parmenio Salazar Jústiz (w&m)222-B (45 rpm)
 Orquesta Sensación"Soy Como Soy"Pedro Junco (w&m)223 (45 rpm)
 Orquesta Sensación"Arrancame La Vida"Agustín Lara (w&m)223(45 rpm) F8-OW-6858
 Abelardo Barroso Orquesta Sensación”La hija de Juan Simón” (1955)224 (45 rpm)
 Abelardo BarrosoOrquesta Sensación)”En Guantánamo” (1955)224 (45 rpm)
 Orquesta Sensación"Cachita"232 (45 rpm)
 Orquesta Sensación"Nosotros"232 (45 rpm)
 Orquesta Sensación"Corazón, No Llores"Rafael Hernández (w&m)239-A(45 rpm) FO-8W-0350(78 rpm) FO-8B-0350
 Orquesta Sensación"A Una Ola"María Grever (w&m)239-B(45 rpm) FO-8W-0351(78 rpm) FO-8B-0351
 Orquesta Sensación"Corazón No Llores"
 Orquesta Sensación"A Una Ola"María Grever (w&m)239(45 rpm) FO-8W-0351(78 rpm) FO-8B-0351
 Celina y Reutilio(Reutilio Domínguez)"La Caridad Del Cobre"244 (45 rpm)
 Celina y Reutilio(Reutilio Domínguez)"El Rey Del Mundo"244 (45 rpm)
 Celina y Reutilio(Reutilio Domínguez)"Oye Mi Olelolei" (1958)Miguel Ojeda Díaz (w&m)Clavelito (pseudonym ofMiguel Ángel Pozo) (w&m)245(45 rpm) G8-OW-8715
 Celina y Reutilio"El Hijo De Elegua" (1958)245 (45 rpm) G8-OW-8715
 Rosita Fornés y Orquesta Hermanos Castro"Es Mi Hombre" (1955)Maurice Yvain (music)251 (78 rpm)Matrix: FO-8B-0330
 Rosita Fornés y Orquesta Hermanos Castro"Sensualidad" (1955)251 (78 rpm)Matrix: FO-8B-0331
 Gina Martín, vocalChappottín y sus Estrellas"Cabio Sile Yeyeo" (1958)Eduardo Angulo254(45 rpm) G8-OW-0263
 Gina Martín, vocalChappottín y sus Estrellas"No Puedes Dejarme" (1958)Luis Martínez Griñán (w&m)254(45 rpm) G8-OW-0763
 Sensación Orquesta"Allá en el Rancho Grande"Silvano R. Ramos (w&m)Jararaca & Ratinho(José Luís Rodrigues Calazans)Vicente Paiva45-261F8-OW-3111
 Sensación Orquesta"Siempre en mi Corazón"Ernesto Lecuona (music)45-261F8-OW-3112
 Abelardo BarrosoOrquesta Sensación"El Manisero" (1956)262(78 rpm)FB-OB-311345 G8-OW-3113
 Abelardo BarrosoOrquesta Sensación"Resabroso Cha-Cha-Cha" (1956)By Gilberto Ruíz262(78 rpm)FB-OB-311345 G8-OW-3113
 Chappottín y sus EstrellasMiguelito Cuní, vocalist"Fidelina"By Eloy Martínez282(45 rpm) G8-OW-7580
 Chappottín y sus Estrellas"La Protesta de Baraguá"Luis Martínez Griñán (w&m)282 (45 rpm)
 Orquesta RiversideTito Gómez (vocalist)Pedro Vila, director"Ritmando Cha Cha Chá"Bebo Valdés (w&m)288-A(45 rpm) (78 rpm) 
 Orquesta RiversideTito Gómez (vocalist)Pedro Vila, director"Bayamo"Ramóne Cabrera (w&m)288-B(45 rpm) (78 rpm) 
 Pototo y Filomeno con Melodías del 40"Carta de Mamita"295(78 rpm) Matrix: G8-OB-9016
 Pototo y Filomeno con Melodías del 40"Hhorita va Llové"295(78 rpm) Matrix: G8-OB-9017
 Guaguancó MatanceroReleased in 1954"Los Beodos"By Lorenzo Martínez298 (78 rpm)G8-OB-990445 G8-OW-9904
 Guaguancó MatanceroReleased in 1954Hortensio Alfonso (aka "Virulilla") (vocalist)Esteban Lantri (aka "Saldiguera") (vocalist)"Los Muñequitos"Esteban Lantrí (w&m)()298 (78 rpm)G8-OB-990545 G8-OW-9905
 Chappottín y sus EstrellasMiguelito Cuní, vocal"Rompe Saraguey," Virgilio Gonzalez302 (45 rpm) GO-8W-0541?
 Chappottín y sus EstrellasMiguelito Cuní, vocal"No Tiene Telaraña,"302 (45 rpm)
 Rita Montaner"Ya No Creo"Eduardo Saborit Pérez (w&m)Rita Montaner (w&m)305
 Rita Montaner"Ay, Qué Sospecha Tengo"305
 Guaguancó MatanceroSaldiguera & Virulilla"Tá Contento el Pueblo"By Florencio Calle309(45 rpm) H8-OB-2679
 Guaguancó MatanceroSaldiguera & Virulilla"Cantar Maravilloso"By Esteban Lantri309(45 rpm) H8-OB-2680
 Orquesta RiversidePedro Vila, directorTito Gómez (lead vocalist)"Me Voy Pa' Pinar del Río"Néstor P. CruzPseudonym of Néstor Pinelo (w&m)(né Néstor Manuel Pinelo Cruz)310-A (45 rpm)8008-A (45 rpm)
 Orquesta RiversidePedro Vila, directorTito Gómez (lead vocalist)"Yo Fui, Corazón"Juan Bruno Tarraza (w&m)310-B (45 rpm)8008-B (45 rpm)
 Chappottín y sus Estrellas"Yo Si Como Candela"By Félix Chappottín321(45 rpm) H8-OW-3854
 Chappottín y sus EstrellasMiguelito Cuní, vocal"Nereyda"By Gustavo Betancourt321(45 rpm) H8-OW-3853
 Grupo Guaguancó Matancero"El Chisme de la Cuchara"Florencio Calle "Catalino" (w&m)331 A(45 rpm) H8-OW-4772
 Grupo Guaguancó Matancero"La Bandera de mi Tierra"Florencio Calle "Catalino" (w&m)331 B(45 rpm)
 Conjunto CasablancaErnesto García, vocal"Mi Cochecito"Juanito Blez (w&m)332(45 rpm) H8-OW-4785
 "Te Miro En La Copa"By Tony Tejera332(45 rpm) H8-OW-4784
 Orquesta RiversideTito Gómez (vocalist)"Eterna Vanidad"María Antonia Fariñas335-A (45 rpm)
 Orquesta RiversideTito Gómez (vocalist)"Mulata Guapachá"Luis YáñezRolando Gómez (w&m)335-B (45 rpm)
 Orquesta Loyola"Escucha El Silbidito"By Héctor de Soto338(45 rpm) H8-5W-5275
 Orquesta Loyola"Amor En Chachacha"338 (45 rpm)
 Alberto Rochi con el Conjunto Casablanca"Rondando Tu Esquina"By Carlos José Pérez "Charlo346-A (45 rpm)
 Alberto Rochi con el Conjunto Casablanca"Idilio"346-B (45 rpm)
 Conjunto Casablanca"Como Esta La Malanga"Félix Cárdenas (w&m)347-A (45 rpm)
 Conjunto Casablanca"No Pongo Condición"347-B (45 rpm)
 Orquesta RiversideTito Gómez, vocalPedro Vila, conductor"Vereda Tropical"352 (45 rpm)
 Orquesta Riverside"Chachachá de Los Perros"352 (45 rpm)
 Conjunto CasablancaErnesto García, vocal"Nuevo Para Ti"Alfonso Fleitas354-A(45 rpm) ICD-45-773 A
 Conjunto CasablancaErnesto García, vocal"Ritmo De Palo"By Senén Suárez354-B(45 rpm) ICD-45-773 B
 Guaguancó MatanceroHortensio Alfonso (aka "Virulilla") (vocalist)Esteban Lantri (aka "Saldiguera") (vocalist)"Te Aseguro Yo"Florencio Calle "Catalino" (w&m)359-A (45 rpm)
 Guaguancó MatanceroHortensio Alfonso (aka "Virulilla") (vocalist)Esteban Lantri (aka "Saldiguera") (vocalist)"En Este Ritmo"Florencio Calle "Catalino" (w&m)359-B (45 rpm)
 Orquesta Melodías del 40"Tunas-Bayamo"Regino Frontela Fraga (w&m)263-A (45 rpm)G8-0B-3289
 Orquesta Melodías del 40"Prisionero"Julián Fiallo (w&m)263-B (45 rpm)G8-0B-3290
 Orquesta RiversideAdolfo Guzmán, directorTito Gómez, vocal"Blancas Azucenas"369-A (45 rpm)
 Orquesta RiversideAdolfo Guzmán, directorTito Gómez, vocal"Mañana Por la Mañana"369-B (45 rpm)
 Severíno Ramos y Su Orquesta(Severíno Ramos Betancourt)Héctor Prado Jiménez y Cuarteto Valdivia (vocalists)"Cha Cha Güere"Luis Reyes (w&m)Severíno Ramos (w, m & arr.)371-A (45 rpm)
 Severíno Ramos y Su Orquesta"Mi Gran Locura"Severíno Ramos (w&m)Carlos López (w&m)371-B (45 rpm)
 Papín y Sus Rumberos"Mi Quinto"Pascual Herrera (w&m)Ricardo Abreu Hernández (w&m)379-A (45 rpm)
 Papín y Sus Rumberos"Franciscua"Alfredo Abreu (w&m)379-B (45 rpm)
 Olga Guillot"No Ya No Te Puedo Amar"381-A (45 rpm)
 Olga Guillot"La Noche De Anoche"381-B (45 rpm)
 Orquesta RiversideAdolfo Guzmán, director"Guacanayabo"Ángel Castro (w&m)383-A (45 rpm)
 Orquesta RiversideAdolfo Guzmán, director"Todo en Tí" ("Habla de Amor")Pedro MéndezSeveríno Ramos383-B (45 rpm)
 Papín y Sus RumberosFuico (né Rolando Hermido Franco) (vocalist)"Tu Olvido" ("Los Rosales")Vicente Spina (w&m)385-A (45 rpm)
 Papín y Sus RumberosFuico (né Rolando Hermido Franco) (vocalist)385-B (45 rpm)
 Septeto NacionalIgnacio Piñeiro"Eterna Primavera"389-A (45 rpm)
 Septeto NacionalIgnacio Piñeiro"Llegó La Tora"Ignacio Piñeiro (music)389-B (45 rpm)
 Orquesta SensaciónRolando Valdés, directorTabenito (née Mario Varona) (vocals)Luis Donald (vocals)"Vacila con tú Trago"Music and words by:Rolando Valdés"Si tú Supieras," Tony Tejera"Abrázame Así," Mario Clavell390-A (45 rpm)
 Orquesta SensaciónRolando Valdés, director"Cha Cha Latin"390-B (45 rpm)
 Arsenio Rodríguez y Su ConjuntoLuís "Wito" Kortright (vocals)Julián Llanos (vocals)Cándido Antomattei (vocals)"Carraguao Alante"By Emma Lucía Martínez393-A(45 rpm) ICD 45-139 A(Hecho en Cuba por Impresora Cubana de Discos S.A.)
 Arsenio Rodríguez y Su ConjuntoLuís "Wito" Kortright (vocals)Julián Llanos (vocals)Cándido Antomattei (vocals)"Hay Fuego En El 23"By Emma Lucía Martínez393-B(45 rpm) ICD 45-139 B(Hecho en Cuba por Impresora Cubana de Discos S.A.)
 Orquesta RiversideAdolfo Guzmán, directorTito Gómez (vocalist)"Amor Amor"Gabriel Ruíz (w&m)397-A
 Orquesta RiversideAdolfo Guzmán, directorTito Gómez (vocalist)"Pensamiento"Eduardo Sánchez de Fuentes397-B
 Chapuseaux & DamironGilberto Valdes, flute soloist"Alla Va Eso"By Adelina Leido402 (45 rpm) J8-OW-7934
 "La Subidora,"402 (45 rpm)
 Mercedita Valdés conPapín y Sus Rumberos"Er' Día Que Nací Yo"Antonio Quintero (w&m)Pascual Guillén (w&m)Juan Mostazo (w&m)411-A (45 rpm)
 Mercedita Valdés conPapín y Sus Rumberos"Ya Me Cansé"Contains:411-B (45 rpm)
 Papín y Sus Rumberos"Tani"413-A (45 rpm)
 Papín y Sus Rumberos"Saludo Nacional"413-B (45 rpm)
 Orquesta RiversideAdolfo Guzmán, director;  Tito Gómez, vocal"Cuando Ya No Me Quieras"By Curates Castilla418-A(45 rpm) ICD-45-107 A
 Orquesta RiversideAdolfo Guzmán, directorTito Gómez, vocal"Frenesi"By Alberto Domínguez418-B(45 rpm) ICD-45-107 B
 Rolo Martinez; Orquesta de Raul Díaz"Vida de Mi Amor"Gustavo Betancourt427-A(45 rpm) ICD-45-119 A
 Rolo Martinez; Orquesta de Raul Díaz"Lo Decia El"427-B(45 rpm) ICD-45-119 B
 Solera De EspañaEnrique Oliva, directorJaime Ventura (vocalist)"La Escalera"Benito Ulecia (music)Fernando Rodríguez Clemente (words)431-A(45 rpm) ICD-45-136 AGrabacion Musart
 Solera De EspañaEnrique Oliva, directorJorge De La Cruz (vocalist)"El Nombre de España"Antonio Guijarro Campoy (words)Manuel Monreal Díaz (music)431-B(45 rpm) ICD-45-136 BGrabacion Musart
 Pototo y FilomenoMelodías Del 40"Una Carta De Fidel"By Leopoldo Fernández437-A (45 rpm)Matrix: ICD-45 152 A(manufactured by Impresora Cubana de Discos S.A.)
 Pototo y FilomenoMelodías Del 40"Ensalada Rebelde"By M. Godinet & Leopoldo Fernández437-B (45 rpm)Matrix: ICD-45 152 B(manufactured by Impresora Cubana de Discos S.A.)
 Papín y Sus Rumberos"Blancas Margaritas"444-A (45 rpm)
 Papín y Sus Rumberos"Yo Soy Cubano"444-B (45 rpm)
 Antonio Aguilar Barraza"Bala Perdida"448-A (45 rpm)
 "Sonaron Cuatro Balazos"448-B (45 rpm)
 Orquesta Riverside, Adolfo Guzmán, directorTito Gómez, vocal"Mambo Mambi"By Mario BauzáArr by René Hernandez452-B(45 rpm) ICD-45-212 B
 Orquesta Estrellas CubanasCalzado brothers (vocals):Pedro Manuel "Rudy" CalzadoLuis Mariano CalzadoSergio Calzado"Di Que Sí Me Quieres"Félix Reina (w&m)460-A(45 rpm) ICD-45-238 A
 Orquesta Estrellas CubanasCalzado brothers (vocals):Pedro Manuel "Rudy" CalzadoLuis Mariano CalzadoSergio Calzado"Ya No Vuelvas Mas"Félix Reina (w&m)460-B(45 rpm) ICD-45-238 B
 Pototo y Filomeno y Su Orquesta"Enciéndeme la Vela"Luis Fernández (w&m)Bienvenido Brens (w&m)467(45 rpm) Matrix: ICD-45-256 A
 Pototo y Filomeno y Su Orquesta"El Jabonero"Eliseo Grenet (w&m)Antonio Radillo467(45 rpm) Matrix: ICD-45-256 B
 Fuico y Su Ritmo"Yo Tenía Una Mujer"Released 1959471-A(45 rpm) ICD-45-273 A
 Fuico y Su Ritmo"Al Pan y Al Vino"Ricardo Díaz (w&m)Released 1959471-B(45 rpm) ICD-45-273 B
 Julio Cueva and His Orchestra"El Golpe Bibijagua"By Julio Cueva486-A (78 rpm)(45 rpm) G8-OB-330-A(45 rpm) ICD-45-330 A
 Julio Cueva and His Orchestra"El Marañon"486-B (78 rpm)(45 rpm) G8-OB-330-B(45 rpm) ICD-45-330 B
 Estrellas de Chocolate (Félix "Chocolate" Alfonso)Filiberto Hernández Fuentes & León Lahera Wilson, vocals"Fania"By Reinaldo Bolaños490-A(45 rpm) ICD-45-334 A
 Estrellas de Chocolate"Era De Esperar"By Eugenio Lahera Wilson490-B(45 rpm) ICD-45-334 B
 "Quiero Comprenderte"452-A(45 rpm) ICD-45-212 A
 Orquesta Sensación"Rosa Mustia"By Ángel Díaz 492-A (78 rpm)(45 rpm) ICD-45-336 A
 Orquesta Sensación"Don Tenorio"By Evelio Landa492-B (78 rpm)(45 rpm) ICD-45-336 B
 Orquesta RiversideTito Gómez (vocalist)""By Adolfo Guzmán493-A (45 rpm)Matrix: ICD-45-337 A 493
 Orquesta RiversideTito Gómez (vocalist)"Otra Descarga"By Pedro Jústiz493-B (45 rpm)Matrix: ICD-45-337 B 493
 Abelardo BarrosoOrquesta Sensación"Coctel Para Dos"Coslow & Johnson (w&m)496 (78 rpm)(45 rpm) G8-45-362-A45 ICD-45-362 A
 Abelardo BarrosoOrquesta Sensación"Vuelve Navidad"496 (78 rpm)(45 rpm) G8-45-362 B(45 rpm) ICD-45-362 B
 Banda Policía Nacional RevolucionariaPatrullas Juveniees, chorus"Himno Nacional Cubano"By Perucho Figueredo497-A(45 rpm) 45-497-A
 Banda Policía Nacional RevolucionariaPatrullas Juveniees, chorus"Himno Invasor"497-B(45 rpm) 45-497-B
 Julio Cueva and His Orchestra"Tingo Talango"By Julio Cueva501-AG8-OB-387-A(45 rpm) ICD-45-387 A
 Julio Cueva and His Orchestra"Chicharron de Palanca"501-BG8-OB-387-B(45 rpm) ICD-45-387 B
 Tabenito (née Mario Varona) (vocalist) con laOrquesta SensaciónDirected by Rolando Valdés"Danzon Cha"By Rolando Valdés539-A(45 rpm) ICD-45-582 A
 Eddy Álvarez con laOrquesta SensaciónDirected by Rolando Valdés"Contra Tu Traición"By Marcelino Garriga539-B(45 rpm) ICD-45-582 B
 Olga Guillot y Orquesta Humberto Suárez"Comunicando Rock"Luis Palomar Dapena (words)Segovia (pseudonym ofAntonio López-Quiroga) (music)565-A(45 rpm) ICD-45-??? AReleased on 78 rpm & 45 rpmCatalog N° 8001-A
 Olga Guillot y Orquesta Humberto Suárez"Vete Di Mi"Virgilio Expósito (music)Homero Expósito (words)565-B(45 rpm) ICD-45-??? BReleased on 78 rpm & 45 rpmCatalog N° 8001-B
 Beto Díaz y Su Orquesta(Mario Roberto Díaz Hornedo)"Palitos Chinos"()Jack Lawrence (music)Eliot Daniel (music)610-A(45 rpm) P-610-A
 Beto Díaz y Su Orquesta(Mario Roberto Díaz Hornedo)"Envidias"José Ángel Espinoza610-B(45 rpm) P-610-B
 Conroy (Conrado) Wilson & His Combo"El Manisero"By Moisés Simons620-A(45 rpm) ICD-45-946 B(45 rpm) 45-8012
 Conroy (Conrado) Wilson & His Combo"A B C Blues"By Conroy (Conrado) Wilson620-B(45 rpm) ICD-45-946 A
 Carlos M. Delgadoy Su Cunjunto"Hormiga o Alacran"Carlos M. Delgado (w&m)(45 rpm) 45-8013
 "La Lengua de Gabino"(45 rpm) 45-8013
 Orquesta Riverside"Consolacion del Sur"By Nestor P. Cruz8018-A (45 rpm)
 Orquesta Riverside"Mira Que Bonita"By Juanito Márquez8018-B (45 rpm)
 Ñico Membiela conPepe Delgado y Su Orquesta"Siboney"Ernesto Lecuona (w&m)(45 rpm) 45-8031
 Ñico Membiela conPepe Delgado y Su Orquesta"Como Arrullo de Palma"Ernesto Lecuona (w&m)(45 rpm) 45-8031
 Conroy (Conrado) Wilson & His Combo"Verano de Amor" (theme from A Summer Place)By Max Steiner621-A(45 rpm) ICD-45-??? A
 Conroy (Conrado) Wilson & His Combo"Ojos Negros"621-B(45 rpm) ICD-45-??? B
 Lino BorgesCon el Conjunto Rumbavana"Enseñame Tu"Jorge Zamora Montalvo636-A(45 rpm) ICD-45-1012 APuchito ECAD-MINCINHecho Por Impresora Cubana de Discos(Nacionalizada)
 Lino BorgesCon el Con el Conjunto Rumbavana"Paloma Herida"636-B (45 rpm) ICD-45-1012 BPuchito ECAD-MINCINHecho Por Impresora Cubana de Discos(Nacionalizada)
 Conroy (Conrado) Wilson & His ComboMagic Guitar with aLatin Twist and Cuban MusicSide A:Side B:PEP-560 (45 rpm) (Spain)Distribuidora Cubana de Discos (jacket)Producido En España Por Iberofon S.A. (label)

Single imports

Talía Industria Manufacturera De Disco S.A. (manufactured in Peru)

LP records

LP Puchito (LPP) series

SP (Special Puchito) series

Série Popular

MLP series

J & G Recordings

LP imports

Talía Industria Manufacturera De Disco S.A. (manufactured in Peru)

See also 
Puchito Records

Notes

References

Record label discographies
Tropical music discographies